The  Miss Maine USA competition is the pageant that selects the representative for the state of Maine in the Miss USA pageant.  The pageant is directed by The Clemente Organization based in Malden, Massachusetts.

Maine has placed nine times at Miss USA. In 2006, Katee Stearns made the semi-finals, becoming the fifth woman from Maine and the first since 1977 to make the cut. In 2010, Katie Whittier became the first delegate from Maine to reach the top five, finishing 4th runner up. In 2011, Ashley Marble became Maine's first consecutive placement.

Three Miss Maine USAs were former Miss Maine Teen USA titleholders, who competed at Miss Teen USA.  One also competed at Miss America.

Juliana Morehouse of Portland was crowned Miss Maine USA 2023 on November 20, 2022 at Portland Marriott at Sable Oaks in Portland. She will represent Maine for the title of Miss USA 2023.

Gallery of titleholders

Results summary

Placements
4th Runner up: Katie Whittier (2010)
Top 8:  Ashley Lynn Marble (2011)
Top 10/12:  Tina Ann Brown (1977), Marina Gray (2018)
Top 15/16/20: Jackie Lee (1953), Carolyn Komant (1959), Margaret McAleer (1970), Katee Stearns (2006), Rani Williamson (2012)

Maine holds a record of 9 placements at Miss USA.

Winners 

Color key

 

1 Ages at the time of the crowning

References

External links

Maine
Maine culture
Women in Maine
Recurring events established in 1952
1952 establishments in Maine